Savar Beyg (also Romanized as Savār Beyg; also known as Bīlegī, Lāsavār, and Savār Bīlegī) is a village in Zamkan Rural District, in the Central District of Salas-e Babajani County, Kermanshah Province, Iran. At the 2006 census, its population was 97, in 19 families.

References 

Populated places in Salas-e Babajani County